"Summer Nights" is a popular song from the musical Grease. Written by Jim Jacobs and Warren Casey, its best-known version was recorded by American actor and singer John Travolta and British-Australian singer, songwriter and actress Olivia Newton-John for the big-screen adaptation of the musical, and released as a single that same year. It was released in August 1978 as the fourth single from the movie's soundtrack album and became a massive hit worldwide during the summer of 1978. Parts of the song were introduced to a new audience when it was re-released in the 1990s as part of a megamix of several songs from the movie version.

Background
In the movie version of Grease, Travolta and Newton-John played the lead roles of Danny Zuko and Sandy Olsson.

The song's genesis stems from a summertime love affair between Danny and Sandy, which had ended upon Sandy's revelation that she was moving back to Australia with her family; however, Sandy soon learns that her family is staying in the United States and subsequently enrolls at Rydell High School, where Danny is also a student. In the original stage version, Sandy Dumbrowski, who like many other characters in the play is a Catholic of Polish descent, originally attends parochial school. On the other hand, Danny lied to her and claimed to attend Lake Forest Academy, a prestigious real-life private school in Chicago. Sandy's parents' decision to pull her out of Catholic school and put her in public Rydell High exposes Danny's subterfuge. It quickly becomes clear that there are unresolved feelings of love between Danny and Sandy.

Separately and unknown to each other, both Danny and Sandy meet with their respective group of friends and share their perspectives of their summertime fling. Danny, the leader of a greaser gang known as "The T-Birds" (the "Burger Palace Boys" in the stage show), brags about the physical aspects of the relationship; Sandy remarks to the schoolgirl clique "The Pink Ladies" about her emotional attachment to Danny. The resulting conversations are played out through the song.

Of the cast members, only Travolta and Newton-John provided vocals for the previous single from the soundtrack, "You're The One That I Want", but other members of the cast contributed backing and cameo lead vocals to "Summer Nights". The only vocal contributions on the soundtrack from Kelly Ward (Putzie) and Michael Tucci (Sonny) are their single questions in this song (Sonny also had no solo lines in the musical; the two songs from the musical by Putzie's stage counterpart were cut from the film). Stockard Channing (Rizzo)'s solo line "'Cause he sounds like a drag"— a bowdlerization of the likely slur used in the original Chicago version—was spoken rather than sung. The film version's background lyrics quote three songs; "Da Doo Ron Ron" by The Crystals, "Down, Dooby" (a nonce lyric used in both "Tonight I Fell in Love" by The Tokens and "Breaking Up Is Hard to Do" by Neil Sedaka), and "Papa-Oom-Mow-Mow" by The Rivingtons (later made famous as Part 2 of "Surfin' Bird" by The Trashmen); that were released in the early 1960s, a few years after the film's setting of fall 1958.

"Summer Nights" was originally written for the stage show's transition to Broadway. The original Chicago version of the musical (staged only once since the 1970s) had a different song, "Foster Beach," at that point.

Record World said "The effect is era-perfect and its unique sound should drive it up summer playlists."

Chart performance
"Summer Nights" reached No. 5 on the US Billboard Hot 100, and spent two weeks at No. 3 on Cash Box Top 100. The song was an even bigger hit in the UK, spending seven weeks at No. 1. Combined with an earlier nine-week run with "You're the One That I Want," the Travolta-Newton-John duet team spent 16 weeks at No. 1 during 1978 in the UK.

In 2004, the song finished at #70 in AFI's 100 Years...100 Songs survey of top tunes in American cinema.

In 2010, Billboard ranked it No. 9 on their "Best Summer Songs of All Time" list.

Charts

Weekly charts

Year-end charts

Decade-end charts

Sales and certifications

Cover versions
 Angélica María and Raúl Vale recorded a Spanish-language cover titled "Noches de verano", which (List of number-one hits of 1979 (Mexico)) reached #1 in Mexico in 1979.

References

External links
 

1978 singles
European Hot 100 Singles number-one singles
John Travolta songs
Olivia Newton-John songs
Songs from Grease (film)
Songs from Grease (musical)
Songs written by Jim Jacobs
Songs written by Warren Casey
UK Singles Chart number-one singles
Irish Singles Chart number-one singles
Male–female vocal duets
1972 songs
RSO Records singles